Champlain Valley Union High School (CVU) is a high school located in the town of Hinesburg, Vermont, United States. The school serves the towns of Charlotte, Hinesburg, Shelburne, St. George, and Williston. The enrollment for the 2017-2018 school year was 1,322 students with 103 faculty.

CVU was established in 1964 to serve the Chittenden County towns outside of Burlington. It is currently the largest high school by enrollment in the state of Vermont.

Infrastructure
The CVU property contains a baseball field, a softball field, a field hockey field, a football field, a track, and three soccer fields. During the spring, the field hockey and soccer fields are used for lacrosse. CVU added a goat farm onto its campus in the spring of 2017.

Athletics

The school mascot is the Redhawk, having changed its name from Crusaders in 2006 because many had found the former name to be offensive. The school's athletic colors are red and white.

CVU competes in Division 1 brackets for all sports. Its chief athletic rivals are nearby South Burlington High School, Essex High School, and Mount Mansfield Union High School.

The CVU Redhawks have met the Rice Memorial Green Knights in the boys basketball state semi-finals for two consecutive years.

In 2022, CVU finished as the second seeded team in the Vermont division 1 boys basketball season, and had two players be named to the Free Press metro division first and second team.

The school competes in the following sports:

Fall sports
Men's cross country - won state championships in 1984, 1985, 1999, 2015, 2016, and 2019
Women's cross country - won state championships in 1988, 2003, 2004, 2005, 2006, 2007, 2009, 2010, 2011, 2012, 2013, 2014, 2015, 2016, 2017, and 2018. Won New England Championships in 2003, 2010, 2011, 2016, 2018 and 2019.
Field hockey - won state championship in 2022
Football
Men's soccer - won state championship in 1990, 2002, 2003, 2004, 2005, 2006, 2007, 2009, 2012, 2018, and 2019
Women's soccer - won state championship in 2011, 2012, 2013, 2014, and 2015
Co-ed sailing (club)
Co-ed rowing (club)
Golf

Winter sports
Alpine skiing
Men's basketball
Women's basketball - won state championship in 2012-2013, 2013-2014, and 2014-2015
Gymnastics - won state championship in 2018, ending Essex's 12 year run, and in 2020
Men's ice hockey - won state championship in 2009, 2011, and 2014
Women's ice hockey
Men's nordic skiing - won state championships in 2010, 2012, 2014, 2015, and 2017
Women's nordic skiing - won state championships in 2011, 2012, and 2014
Wrestling
Snowboard Club (new as of 2007)
Indoor track Club

Spring sports
Baseball - 2003, 2012, 2013, 2019
Men's lacrosse - State Champions 2021 Division Champions 2013–2017
Women's lacrosse
Softball
Men's tennis
Women's tennis - Vermont state champions, Division I 2009
Track and field (men and women) - men's team won the 2016 Division 1 State Championship, their first state championship
Rugby (club)
Co-ed sailing (club)
Ultimate (men and women)
Co-ed rowing (club)

Notable alumni
Curtis T. McMullen, Fields Medalist and Cabot Professor of Mathematics at Harvard University
Megan Nick, freestyle skier and 2022 Winter Olympic bronze medalist
Morgan Page, Grammy-nominated DJ and music producer

References

External links

Public high schools in Vermont
Educational institutions established in 1964
Buildings and structures in Hinesburg, Vermont
Schools in Chittenden County, Vermont
1964 establishments in Vermont